is a micro-asteroid on an eccentric orbit, classified as near-Earth object of the Apollo group that made a close approach of 0.17 lunar distances from Earth on 14 August 2017 at 21:23 UTC. It was first observed by ATLAS at Haleakala Observatory, Hawaii, on 16 August 2017, two days after its closest approach. The asteroid is estimated to measure between 37 and 83 meters in diameter. It flew past Earth at a speed of 23.97 km/s under the south pole of the Earth.

References

External links 
 MPEC 2017-Q60 : 2017 QP1, Minor Planet Electronic Circular, 20 Aug. 2017
 

Minor planet object articles (unnumbered)
20170814
20170814